The Districts of Somaliland (also known as local government districts) are second-level administrative subdivisions of Somaliland, below the level of region. There are a total of 22 district, each district is rated A, B, C, or D according to population, budget, and economic scale with the highest being A grade. The district where the state capital is located is always Class A (by Article 9 of the Local Government Law). The region with the most districts is Sanaag region (5), while the region with the fewest is Sahil region (2).

The notation follows the Somali version of the 2019 Local Government Act.

History 
From 1884 to 26 June 1960, Somaliland was divided into 6 administrative districts and the council (capital) was located in the city of the same name.

List of Districts

Awdal Region

Marodi Jeh Region

Sanaag Region

Sahil Region

Sool Region

Togdheer Region

See also
Administrative divisions of Somaliland
Regions of Somaliland

References

 
Subdivisions of Somaliland
Somaliland, Districts
Somaliland 2
Districts, Somaliland
Somaliland geography-related lists